Ron Yosef (Hebrew: רון יוסף) is the founder of the Israeli organization Hod, which represents Israeli gay and lesbian Orthodox Jews. His organization has played a central role in the recent reevaluation of the role of religious homosexuals in the Israeli Religious Zionist movement.

Background
Born into a traditional Adeni Yemenite family in 1974, Yosef began to become aware of his sexual identity in his early twenties, if not earlier. During his time in the IDF, Yosef served in the Adjutant Corps and the Medical Corps. Coming out at 21, he moved in with a now-deceased grandmother who provided love and support.   He at first left his faith behind, moving to Tel Aviv. However he soon returned to traditional Judaism, continuing his studies in yeshiva and eventually obtaining semichah.

In the closet
For many years Ron Yosef served as a rabbi in Netanya, concealing his sexual orientation. He became involved in the Walla's "Religious Gays" Forum. Like all others on the forum, he kept his true identity concealed. Due to differing beliefs and agendas, the various constituencies found on the forum went their separate ways. On February 1, 2008, 12 people banded together with rabbi Yosef and a religious attorney named Itay. An internet website was launched that month. Due to its affinity to the Kabbalistic Sephira Hod or "Majesty" , this name was adopted. The name is connected mystically with truth-telling. From its inception, Hod was—and remains—a totally voluntary association and accepts no outside financial support.

Coming out
From the start, Rabbi Yosef has led the organization, although he was initially known publicly only by his first name, thereby showing the delicate situation of homosexuals in the Jewish Orthodox community in Israel. Yosef remains in his position as a pulpit Rabbi. His congregation remains supportive of him and his work with HOD, but, Yosef freely admits that the younger members of his flock were much easier to convince that nothing had changed in his relationship to them or his commitment to halakha than were older members.

Yosef received death threats in the year leading up to the 2009 Tel Aviv gay centre shooting.

He testified that his community didn't accept him being a homosexual very easily and it took them a while to accept it. He stated that the younger generation strengthened and supported him, while the older generation had a more difficult experience.

Approach
Rabbi Yosef approaches to the issue of homosexuality in Judaism as follows: "It is clear to me that lying with another man is forbidden, and our starting point is commitment to halacha, the Torah. The goal is not to seek permission. But you need to give us a shoulder and support."

Regarding conversion therapy, Yosef states that "...it is possible to sustain a religious life even with a homosexual orientation [without conversion therapy]", although all options "...should be examined."

On recent attempts to pair religious gay men with lesbian women, Yosef stated that "What they did is problematic. Presenting it as the main option is wrong. It must be stressed that they [sic] are several solutions, and that each person should find the suitable way for himself. However, the initiative does include a positive aspect – that finally people are not trying to conceal and ignore the issue."

Other activities
During 2004 and 2005, he worked with the Association for Society and Culture, a Netanya-based organization devoted to the preservation of the Yemenite Jewish heritage. He is certified to practice before rabbinic courts in family law and is a trained Torah scribe.

2012 Military Rabbinate refusal to address IDF soldiers
In December 2012, the IDF's Military Rabbinate rejected a request made about a year early by Yosef to address Haredi and Religious troops despite over 100 requests from gay troops to HOD for help. This decision was reached despite the fact that least 37 of these requests came from within the Military Rabbinate itself. According to Captain Ofer Han, the chief military rabbi's assistant, in a document to explain the decision to the IDF ombudsman

Given the fact that the Rabbinate had allowed various rabbis to address many hundreds of troops during the previous year——including speakers critical of Israeli and policy and some who harangued troops to disobey orders, this decision created a storm of controversy.  Earlier that year (in January), the Israel Gay Youth (IGY) Movement released a study stating that  at least half the homosexual soldiers who serve in the IDF suffer from violence and homophobia. At the time IGY's head stated  that "I am happy to say that the intention among the top brass is to change that."

Current life
A June 2013 article reported that Yosef lives with his partner, who is also Orthodox, although the two men don't make public appearances or go out together. He is proud that HOD has been able to reach out to over 6,000 religious gays and 163 Orthodox rabbis from Israel and abroad have endorsed HOD's 2008  "Document of Principles", which calls on Jews to separate the prohibited sexual acts from the person and his/her sexual orientation.

See also

  Homosexuality and Judaism
  Judaism and sexuality
  LGBT clergy in Judaism
  LGBT rights in Israel

References

External links
  Article about Yosef 
  Gay Orthodox Rabbi
  Open Letter to the leaders and rabbis of Orthodox Judaism, English version from the www.hod.org.il website Retrieved on 14 Aug. 2015
  Gay with Perfect Faith by Nissan Strauchler. Published Feb. 16, 2010.
  Gay Rabbi Seeks Recognition. Published May 20, 2010.
  Israeli Rabbi Speaks Out on Being Gay  Jewish World, 06.07.2013.
  Israel Rabbi Speaks Out on Being Gay and Orthodox Ma'an News Agency, May 17, 2013.
  Jewish, Religious and Gay: A Young Rabbi Reconciles His Strict Adherence to Judaism with His Homosexuality i24 news, Sept. 30, 2013.
  Military Rabbinate Rejects Gay Rabbi by Yoav Zitun. Ynet News. Published on December 7, 2012.
  ″Out of the Ark: First Gay Orthodox Rabbi Speaks Openly″ published on 10.08.2009. (This article is in Hebrew.)
  Suicide Crisis Among Religious Gay Teens In Israel

1974 births
Israeli human rights activists
Israeli Modern Orthodox rabbis
Israeli rabbis
Jewish scribes (soferim)
LGBT rabbis
LGBT Orthodox Jews
Israeli gay men
Israeli LGBT rights activists
Gay Jews
Living people
People from Netanya
Yemenite Jews in Israel
Yemenite Orthodox rabbis